Turachi (Turası) is a rural locality (a village) in Isametovsky Selsoviet, Ilishevsky District, Bashkortostan, Russia. The population was 205 as of 2010. There are 3 streets.

Geography 
Turachi is located 24 km northwest of Verkhneyarkeyevo (the district's administrative centre) by road. Zyaylevo is the nearest rural locality.

References 

Rural localities in Ilishevsky District